Shannon Lucio (born June 25, 1980) is an American actress of Italian descent.

Born in Denver, Colorado, Lucio grew up in San Antonio, Texas, and graduated from John Marshall High School. Her family is of Italian descent.  She is a graduate of the University of Southern California. She is well known for the acting role of Lindsay Gardner on The O.C.. Lucio was later cast in the lead female role of the CBS television drama Moonlight (2007), but was replaced by Sophia Myles in April 2007. Lucio also played Miriam Hultz/Trishanne in the series Prison Break.

Filmography

Film

Television

References

External links

1980 births
Actresses from Denver
Actresses from San Antonio
American film actresses
American television actresses
Living people
University of Southern California alumni
21st-century American actresses